KSJC-LP is a Freeform formatted broadcast radio station licensed to and serving Silverton, Colorado. KSJC-LP is owned and operated by Silverton Community Radio.

External links
 Mountain Radio 92.5 Online
 

SJC-LP
SJC-LP